On 26 February 2021 at around 1:30 AM, two buses were involved in a head-on collision at Asafo-Akyem on the Accra-Kumasi highway in Ghana. Nineteen people were confirmed dead, including both drivers.

Background 
The bus heading from Accra to Kumasi was operated by 39-year-old Emmanuel Asante Opoku. The other bus involved was VIP branded and was heading to Accra from Sankore, the man operating the bus was 55-year-old Kofi George.

Incident 
Police revealed that Emmanuel Opoku tried to overtake four trucks in a row and collided with the VIP bus head-on. Sixteen people died at the scene while several others were taken to hospital. The number of confirmed deaths later rose to nineteen.

References 

2021 disasters in Ghana
2021 in Ghana
2021 road incidents
2020s road incidents in Africa
Bus incidents in Africa
February 2021 events in Africa
Road incidents in Ghana